The Fabius River (pronounced FAY-bee-us) is a  tributary of the Mississippi River in northeastern Missouri in the United States. It is formed near its mouth by the confluence of the North Fabius River and the South Fabius River. The North Fabius River also flows through southeastern Iowa.

Each of the three rivers have been subjected to substantial straightening and channelization.

According to tradition, the Fabius River is named for the Roman consul Quintus Fabius Maximus Verrucosus. However, the State Historical Society of Missouri suggests Fabius actually was the name of a French pioneer in the area.

Course

North Fabius River
It flows generally southeastwardly through Davis County in Iowa and Schuyler, Scotland, Knox, Clark, Lewis and Marion counties in Missouri, past the towns of Memphis and Monticello, both in Missouri. In its upper course it collects two short tributaries known as the North Fork North Fabius River and the South Fork North Fabius River. At Taylor, Missouri, the North Fork averages a discharge of 467 cubic feet per second.

Middle Fabius River
It flows generally southeastwardly through Knox and Lewis counties, and joins the North Fabius River in southeastern Lewis County. The Middle Fork has a mean annual discharge of 386 cubic feet per second at Ewing, Missouri

South Fabius River
The North Fork rises in Schuyler County and flows through Adair County, and the South Fork rises in Adair County; both flow past the town of Edina. The South Fabius flows generally south-southeastwardly through Knox, Lewis, Shelby and Marion counties, past the town of Newark. Near Newark it collects the Little Fabius River, which rises near Hurdland and flows for its entire length in Knox County. The South Fabius River's average discharge at Taylor is approximately 440 cubic feet per second.

Lower river
The North and South Fabius rivers join to form the Fabius River in northeastern Marion County. The Fabius flows into the Mississippi River about three miles downstream of Quincy, Illinois. The Fabius River averages approximately 907 cubic feet per second at the junction of the North and South Fabius rivers. This discharge is obtained by combining the discharges of the North and South forks,(see above), since the Fabius has never been measured by the USGS.

See also
List of Iowa rivers
List of Missouri rivers

Sources

Columbia Gazetteer of North America entry
DeLorme (1998).  Iowa Atlas & Gazetteer.  Yarmouth, Maine: DeLorme.  .
DeLorme (2002).  Missouri Atlas & Gazetteer.  Yarmouth, Maine: DeLorme.  .

Rivers of Iowa
Rivers of Missouri
Tributaries of the Mississippi River
Rivers of Adair County, Missouri
Bodies of water of Appanoose County, Iowa
Rivers of Clark County, Missouri
Bodies of water of Davis County, Iowa
Rivers of Knox County, Missouri
Rivers of Lewis County, Missouri
Rivers of Marion County, Missouri
Rivers of Schuyler County, Missouri
Rivers of Scotland County, Missouri
Quincy–Hannibal area